Charles Henry Dillon-Lee, 14th Viscount Dillon (1810–1865), was an Irish and English landowner. He lived in Ditchley, Oxfordshire, England, and was represented in Ireland by his agent Charles Strickland.

Birth and origins 
Charles was born on 20 April 1810 in Ely Place (a street near St Stephen's Green) in Dublin. He was the eldest son of Henry Augustus Dillon-Lee and his wife Henrietta Browne. His father was the 13th Viscount Dillon of Costello-Gallen. The Dillons were a widespread Old English family that had settled in Connacht and Leinster and descended from Sir Henry Dillon who had come to Ireland with Prince John in 1185. Charles's mother was the eldest daughter of Colonel Dominick Geoffrey Browne, MP for Mayo and sister of Lord Oranmore and Browne. His parents had married in 1807. He was one of ten siblings, who are listed in his father's article.

Viscount 
On 26 July 1832 Charles succeeded his father as the 14th Viscount Dillon. He inherited land in Ireland and in England. The Irish lands were the ancestral lands owned by the family since Theobald Dillon, 1st Viscount Dillon in the 17th century. They lay in north-eastern Connacht (counties Mayo and Roscommon) and in western Leinster (Westmeath). The land in England was in Oxfordshire and had been acquired more recently by the marriage of the 11th Viscount to Charlotte Lee, daughter of the 2nd Earl of Lichfield in 1744 and the inheritance that followed in 1776 at the death of the 4th Earl of Lichfield.

Marriage and children 
On 1 February 1833 Lord Dillon, as he was now, married Lydia Sophia Story, daughter of Philip Laycock Story and his wife Lydia Baring. She was a granddaughter of Sir Francis Baring, founder of the London merchant house of Barings. They married in Tusmore House, Oxfordshire, England, at that time the home of his father-in-law.

 
Charles and Lydia had two daughters:
Ethelred Florence (died 1910), never married
Geraldine Lee Frances (died 1920), married Captain Charles Augustus Drake Halford in 1859

Slave compensation claim 
Lord Dillon never owned slaves. However, he became involved in a claim under the Slave Compensation Act 1837 because he was one of a group of four people who were trying to recover a debt of £6,000 from Dominick Trant, owner of the Lower Windward Estate on the island of Montserrat in the British West Indies. When on 7 November 1836 Dominick Trant submitted the claim "Montserrat No. 15" for £1,977 (worth £ in ) as a compensation for the loss he incurred by the emancipation of the 128 slaves of the estate, this group submitted a successful counterclaim. This group consisted of Lord Dillon, Philip Laycock Story, Henry Trant and James Flemming. The Dillons, Trants and Storys were related by marriage. Philip Laycock Story was not only Lord Dillon's father-in-law (by his daughter Lydia) but also Dominick Trant's father-in-law (by his daughter Caroline). Frances Trant was an aunt of Dominick Trant and a great-aunt of Lord Dillon by her marriage to General Henry Dillon, the last colonel of Dillon's regiment.

Landlord and Irish famine 
From 1845 to 1849 Ireland suffered the Great Famine. Lord Dillon's Irish estates lay in some of the worst affected areas. Despite living in England and being an absentee landlord in Ireland, he and his estate manager Charles Strickland, who lived at Loughglinn, seem to have been humane and seem to have helped the tenants rather than evicting them. A large stained-glass window in the baptistery of the Cathedral of the Annunciation in Ballaghaderreen, County Roscommon commemorates Lord Dillon for his fairness as a landlord during the great famine. This window was donated by his wife. Another stained-glass window in a chapel on the south side of the cathedral commemorates his agent Charles Strickland.

When Lord Dillon's Mayo tenants were discriminated against at the market of Bellaghy in County Sligo, his agent Charles Strickland built the town of Newtown Dillon in County Mayo next to the county border. The first houses were completed in 1846. The town soon took the name of Charlestown in honour of Charles Strickland.

Death and succession 
On 18 November 1865 Lord Dillon died aged 55 at Ditchley, the family's seat near Charlbury in Oxfordshire. The title passed to his younger brother Theobald Dominick, who became the 15th Viscount Dillon.

A monument to the memory of the 14th Viscount with full-length effigy in white marble was erected in the All Saints church (Church of England), Spelsbury, Oxfordshire. This work is signed by the sculptor Charles Francis Fuller, who worked in Florence.

Notes and references

Notes

Citations

Sources 

 
  – L to M (for Lichfield)
  – Dacre to Dysart
 
 
 
 
 

1810 births
1865 deaths
High Sheriffs of Oxfordshire
Earls in the Jacobite peerage
Charles 14
British slave owners
Recipients of payments from the Slavery Abolition Act 1833